Praner Cheye Priyo is a 1997 Bangladeshi film starring Riaz and Ravina in lead roles. It was Rabina's debut film. The film became a commercial success. The songs "Je Prem Swargo Theke Ase" and "Porena Chokher Polok" enjoyed chart success.

Synopsis 
A robber that is heartless, wicked. One day an old woman slapped him and wanted to know for whom he had committed this sin. The robber thought of his forcibly married wife. He ran and saw that there was no one in the house. And he left his weapon and wept and went to a shrine. The boy grew up named Sajib (Riaz). Meanwhile, his wife died giving birth to a daughter. And she grew up with another childless mother. In a wedding ceremony, this young woman responds to values ​​and pride, and love is born out of love.

Cast 
 Riaz
 Ravina
 Bulbul Ahmed
 Bobita
 Wasimul Bari Rajib
 Humayun Ahmed
 Anwar Hossain
 Abul Hayat

Music 
Ahmed Imtiaz Bulbul was the music director and lyricist of the film.

Soundtrack

References

External links 
 

1997 films
Bengali-language Bangladeshi films
Bangladeshi drama films
1990s Bengali-language films
1997 drama films
Films scored by Ahmed Imtiaz Bulbul